Ruacana Airport  is an airport serving Ruacana and the Ruacana hydroelectric power station in the Omusati Region of Namibia.

The Ruacana non-directional beacon (Ident: RC) is on the field.

See also

List of airports in Namibia
Transport in Namibia

References

External links
 OurAirports - Ruacana
 Ruacana Airport
 OpenStreetMap - Ruacana

Airports in Namibia